Regina is the name of several ships.

Ships with this name include:

Royal Canadian Navy vessels named for the city in Saskatchewan:

Commercial ships
 , a tanker, launched in 1904 and sank off Florida in 1940.
 , a cargo ship, launched in 1907 and sunk in 1913
 , transatlantic ocean liner launched in 1917, renamed  as a troop ship in 1929, and scrapped in 1947.
 , a RO-RO car cruise ferry launched in 1967 as Stena Germanica, renamed A Regina in 1979, sank off Puerto Rico in 1985.

See also
 Regina (disambiguation)

 , a roll-on/roll-off ferry, launched in 1984, and renamed KMP in 2015.
 , a cruiseferry, launched in 1985 as MS Mariella, and renamed MS Mega Regina in 2021.

 , a ship's name for steamships
 , a Royal Canadian Navy shipname

Ship names